Lake Keta is a large freshwater lake in Krasnoyarsk Krai, north-central part of Russia.

Geography
It has an area of 452 km2. The Rybnaya River flows from the lake.

It is located south of Lake Lama and north of Lake Khantayskoye.

See also
List of lakes of Russia

References

Keta